Garrett Timothy Sim (born July 10, 1990) is an American professional basketball player for Élan Béarnais Pau-Orthez for the French Pro A.

College career
Sim came to the University of Oregon from Sunset High School, where he posted 23 points and 9 assists per game as a senior. As a freshman at Oregon, he started 26 games and set his career high of 28 points against Utah. He had confidence issues as a sophomore and started five games. After the season coach Ernie Kent was fired but Sim remained loyal to the program. As a senior, he averaged 12.2 points and 2.5 assists per game.

Professional career
Sim played for Science City Jena in 2013-14 and averaged 20.9 points, 5.7 assists and 1.7 steals per game. Sim joined Crailsheim Merlins in 2014 and averaged 13 points and 4.7 assists per game. In the 2015-16 season he played for Boulogne and averaged 16.9 points, 3.2 rebounds and 6.4 assists per game. In June 2016 he signed for two seasons with JL Bourg of the Pro B. He averaged 13.7 points and 4.4 assists per game in the 2017-18 season. In March 2018 he signed a two-year extension with JL Bourg.

On June 29, 2020, he has signed with Élan Chalon of LNB Pro A. Sim averaged 8.7 points, 2.5 rebounds and 2.7 assists per game. On August 22, 2021, he signed with Sigortam.net İTÜ BB of the Basketball Super League.

On August 24, 2022, he has signed with Élan Béarnais Pau-Orthez for the French Pro A.

The Basketball Tournament
Garrett Sim played for Armored Athlete in the 2018 edition of The Basketball Tournament. In three games, he averaged 5.7 points, .7 assists, and 1.3 rebounds per game. Armored Athlete reached the Super 16 before falling to Boeheim's Army.

References

External links
Twitter handle

1990 births
Living people
American expatriate basketball people in France
American expatriate basketball people in Germany
American men's basketball players
Basketball players from Portland, Oregon
Crailsheim Merlins players
Élan Béarnais players
JL Bourg-en-Bresse players
Oregon Ducks men's basketball players
Point guards
Science City Jena players
SOMB Boulogne-sur-Mer players
Sunset High School (Beaverton, Oregon) alumni